P119 may refer to:

 Papyrus 119, a biblical manuscript
 Piaggio P.119, an Italian experimental fighter aircraft
 P119, a state regional road in Latvia